La ciudad maldita (known in Italian as La Notte rossa del falcon) is a 1978 Spanish-Italian Spaghetti Western murder mystery film directed by Juan Bosch. The film was written by Alberto De Stefanis, produced by José María Cunillés, scored by Franco Julian, and starring Diana Lorys, Luciano Pigozzi, Roberto Camardiel and Daniel Martín. It is based on the novel Red Harvest, by Dashiell Hammett, inspired in Yojimbo, by Kurosawa, and A Fistful of Dollars, by Sergio Leone.

Cast
 Chet Bakon as OP
 Diana Lorys as Dinah
 Roberto Camardiel as Sheriff Noonan
 Daniel Martín as Max Thaler
 Nat Graywood
 Adolfo Thous	
 Alan Collins as Don Wilson
 Eduardo Bea
 Frank Clement
 Francisco Casares
 Manuela Aleardi
 Lone Fleming
 José Antonio Mayans
 José Yepes
 Jesús Enguita
 Antonio Molino Rojo as Peter

References

External links
 

Spanish mystery thriller films
Spanish horror thriller films
1978 Western (genre) films
1978 films
1970s Western (genre) horror films
1970s mystery thriller films
1970s horror thriller films
Films directed by Juan Bosch
Films produced by Alberto Grimaldi
Films based on American novels
Films shot in Almería
1970s Italian films
1970s Spanish films